Antoni Massana i Bertran (24 February 1890 in Barcelona – 9 September 1966 in Raïmat) was a Spanish Jesuit priest and composer. He was maestro de capilla at the Church of the Jesuits, Sagrat Cor de Jesús, at the Col·legi Casp, Barcelona.

The scores of Antoni Massana are preserved in the Biblioteca de Catalunya.

Works, editions and recordings
Works
 Canigó – opera. (1934), in three acts to a libretto by Josep Carner based on the work of Jacint Verdaguer. Concert performance 1936. 1953 staged premiere at the Gran Teatre del Liceu, and recording.

Recordings
 En l'enterro d'un nin. Resignació. on Jacint Verdaguer i el lied català. M. Teresa Garrigosa, soprano ; Emili Blasco, piano La mà de Guido, 2005.

References

Bibliography
 Colomer, Consuelo. Antonio Massana y Beltrán (1890–1966) : I Centenario de su nacimiento : Ensayo biográfico. València: Albatros, 1989.  
 Crespí, Joana. Catàleg del fons Antoni Massana a la Biblioteca de Catalunya. Barcelona: Biblioteca de Catalunya, 1992.

External links
 Scores of Antoni Massana in the Biblioteca de Catalunya

20th-century Spanish Jesuits
Composers from Catalonia
1890 births
1966 deaths
20th-century composers
20th-century Spanish musicians
Musicians from Barcelona